The coat of arms of Honduras is a national emblem of the Republic of Honduras.

Official description
Honduran law describes the coat of arms as follows:

The Arms to be used are an equilateral triangle. In its base there is a volcano between two castles, over them a rainbow, and below it, behind the volcano, raises a sun spreading light. The triangle is settled on a terrain bathed by both seas. Around it, an oval containing the golden letters: REPÚBLICA DE HONDURAS LIBRE, SOBERANA, INDEPENDIENTE. – 15 DE SEPTIEMBRE DE 1821. In the upper part of the oval appears a quiver filled with arrows from which hang cornucopias conjoined with a tie, and the whole lies upon a range of mountains, on which stand three oak trees on the right and three pines on the left, and, conveniently distributed, mines, a bar, a drill, a wedge, a sledgehammer and a hammer.

See also 
 Flag of Honduras
 National Anthem of Honduras

References 

Honduras
National symbols of Honduras
Honduras
Honduras
Honduras
Honduras
Honduras
Honduras